Crataegus × yosgatica or Crataegus yosgatica is a putative hybrid species of hawthorn. It was thought to be a cross between Crataegus monogyna and C. tanacetifolia. A 2014 molecular and morphological study reduced it to a synonym of Crataegus meyeri.

References

yosgatica
Plants described in 1992
Plant nothospecies